Lena Neumann  was a German film editor who worked on more than fifty films during her career. She began her career in the Nazi era, working at a variety of leading German companies including UFA. After the Second World War she worked on rubble films such as Somewhere in Berlin. She was employed by the East German state studio DEFA during the Cold War

Selected filmography
 Between Two Hearts (1934)
 The Riders of German East Africa (1934)
 The Champion of Pontresina (1934) 
 William Tell (1934)
 The Unknown (1936)
 Alarm in Peking (1937)
 Ball at the Metropol (1937)
 Sergeant Berry (1938)
 I Love You (1938)
 The Marriage Swindler (1938)
 Water for Canitoga (1939)
 Beloved World (1942)
 Paracelsus (1943)
 Wozzeck (1947)
 Nothing But Coincidence (1949) 
 The Captain from Cologne (1956)
 Christine (1963)

References

Bibliography 
 Shandley, Robert. Rubble Films: German Cinema in the Shadow of the Third Reich. Temple University Press, 2010.

External links 
 

Year of birth unknown
Year of death unknown
German film editors
German women film editors